Caithness, Sutherland and Easter Ross was a constituency of the Scottish Parliament (Holyrood), in use between 1999 and 2011. It elected one Member of the Scottish Parliament (MSP) by the first past the post method of election. Also, however, it was one of eight constituencies in the Highlands and Islands electoral region, which elects seven additional members, in addition to eight constituency MSPs, to produce a form of proportional representation for the region as a whole.

For the Scottish Parliament election, 2011, Caithness, Sutherland and Easter Ross was redrawn and included as part of Caithness, Sutherland and Ross, along with part of Ross, Skye and Inverness West.

Electoral region 

The other seven constituencies of the Highlands and Islands electoral region during the constituency's existence were: Argyll and Bute, Inverness East, Nairn and Lochaber, Moray, Orkney, Ross, Skye and Inverness West, Shetland and the Western Isles.

The region covers most of Argyll and Bute council area, all of the Highland council area, most of the Moray council area, all of the Orkney council area, all of the Shetland council area and all of Na h-Eileanan Siar.

Constituency boundaries and council area 
The constituency was created at the same time as the Scottish Parliament, in 1999, with the name and boundaries of a pre-existing Westminster (House of Commons) constituency. In 2005, however, Scottish Westminster constituencies were generally replaced with new larger constituencies. The Caithness, Sutherland and Easter Ross Westminster constituency was enlarged slightly, to cover an area also covered by the Ross, Skye and Inverness West Holyrood constituency.

Boundary Review

See Scottish Parliament constituencies and regions from 2011 

Following their First Periodic review into constituencies to the Scottish Parliament, the Boundary Commission for Scotland formed a newly drawn seat to succeed Caithness, Sutherland, and Easter Ross in time for the 2011 election. The new constituency also includes part of the Ross, Skye and Inverness West constituency, and is known as Caithness, Sutherland, and Ross.

Council area 
See also Politics of the Highland council area

Caithness, Sutherland and Easter Ross was the most northerly of three constituencies covering the Highland council area. The other two were Ross, Skye and Inverness West and Inverness East, Nairn and Lochaber. All three were within the Highlands and Islands electoral region. Caithness, Sutherland and Easter Ross has Ross, Skye and Inverness West on its southern boundary. Inverness East, Nairn and Lochaber is further south.

When created in 1999 the constituency boundaries were definable with reference to council wards, which were grouped by the Highland Council in relation to eight council management areas. Constituency and management area names have many elements in common, and the management areas had the boundaries of former districts of the Highland region, as abolished in 1996, namely Caithness, Sutherland, Ross and Cromarty, Skye and Lochalsh, Inverness, Nairn, Lochaber and Badenoch and Strathspey.

The management areas were abolished in 2007, and the council introduced three new corporate management areas, defined as groups of new wards. The boundaries of the corporate management areas are similar to those of Westminster constituencies created in 2005. One corporate management area, the Caithness, Sutherland and Easter Ross area, has boundaries, therefore, which are also similar to those of a Holyrood constituency. The boundaries of the other two corporate areas, the Ross, Skye and Lochaber area and the Inverness, Nairn, and Badenoch and Strathspey area, are quite unlike those of any Holyrood constituency.

Member of the Scottish Parliament

Election results

Footnotes 

Scottish Parliament constituencies and regions 1999–2011
Highland constituencies, Scottish Parliament
1999 establishments in Scotland
Constituencies established in 1999
2011 disestablishments in Scotland
Constituencies disestablished in 2011
Politics of the county of Caithness
Politics of the county of Sutherland
Politics of the county of Ross